There have been four baronetcies created for persons with the surname Willoughby, three in the Baronetage of England and one in the Baronetage of Great Britain. One creation is extant as of 2008.

The Willoughby Baronetcy, of Risley in the County of Derby, was created in the Baronetage of England on 29 June 1611 for Henry Willoughby. The title became extinct on his death in 1649. By his first wife Elizabeth Knollys, daughter of the privateer Sir Henry Knollys, he had a daughter Elizabeth, who married the noted antiquarian Sir Simonds d'Ewes.

The Willoughby Baronetcy, of Selston in the County of Nottingham, was created in the Baronetage of England on 4 August 1660 for William Willoughby. The title became extinct on his death in 1671.

The Willoughby Baronetcy, of Wollaton in the County of Nottingham, was created in the Baronetage of England on 7 April 1677. For more information, see the Baron Middleton.

The Willoughby Baronetcy, of Baldon House in the County of Oxford, was created in the Baronetage of Great Britain on 8 December 1794 for Christopher Willoughby. The third Baronet sat as Member of Parliament for Yarmouth, Newcastle-under-Lyme and Evesham. The fourth Baronet represented Leominster in the House of Commons. The title became extinct on the death of the fifth Baronet in 1918.

Willoughby baronets, of Risley (1611)
Sir Henry Willoughby, 1st Baronet (1579–1649)

Willoughby baronets, of Selston (1660)
Sir William Willoughby, 1st Baronet (c. 1630–1671)

Willoughby baronets, of Wollaton (1677)
see Baron Middleton

Willoughby baronets, of Baldon House (1794)
Sir Christopher Willoughby, 1st Baronet (1748–1808)
Sir Christopher William Willoughby, 2nd Baronet (1793–1813)
Sir Henry Pollard Willoughby, 3rd Baronet (1796–1865)
Sir John Pollard Willoughby, 4th Baronet (1799–1866)
Sir John Christopher Willoughby, 5th Baronet (1859–1918)

See also
Baron Willoughby of Parham

References

 

Baronetcies in the Baronetage of England
Extinct baronetcies in the Baronetage of Great Britain
Extinct baronetcies in the Baronetage of England
1611 establishments in England
1794 establishments in Great Britain